Annie Cohen (15 November 186112 April 1939) was an Australian community and charity worker at Berry Street community service organisation and charity in Victoria. She went to Presbyterian Ladies' College, Melbourne in 1879. Her father Edward Aaron Cohen was a politician and mayor of Melbourne. She married Montague Cohen in 1881. Annie and Montague had only one child, politician Harold Edward Cohen.

Memberships 
Cohen was a committee member, treasurer, and president at the Victorian Infant Asylum; Vice President of Melbourne Jewish Women's Guild; and Committee member of Melbourne District Nursing Society.

References 

Australian women philanthropists
Australian philanthropists
Philanthropists from Melbourne
19th-century Australian women
20th-century Australian women
1861 births
1939 deaths